Elizabeth Chong's Tiny Delights is a cooking series originally aired on Australian television in 2003. It follows renowned chef, Elizabeth Chong in her journeys around the culinary map of China. The program consists of Chong spending ten minutes talking about a specific place, the attractions and the 'tiny delights' engendered to the area, it then splits to the studio where she shows the audience how to make one of the 'tiny delights' from the area. She generally does four segments on the area and two tiny delights.

External links

 https://web.archive.org/web/20060907094518/http://www.sbs.com.au/whatson/index.php3?progdate=21:07:2006

Special Broadcasting Service original programming
Australian cooking television series
2002 Australian television series debuts